is an order of "professional disqualification" under German law.  Berufsverbot may be translated into English as "professional ban".

A  disqualifies the recipient from engaging in certain professions or activities on the grounds of their criminal record, political convictions or membership in a particular group.

The  in National Socialist Germany 

Pursuant to a 1933 law (the ), many Jews, artists, political opponents, and others were prohibited by the National Socialist government in Germany from engaging in certain professions.

Post-World War II  
After 1945, the allied authorities in West Germany issued  orders against certain political filmmakers, such as Leni Riefenstahl, who got a lifelong Berufsverbot.

1972 Anti-Radical Decree 
On 28 January 1972 the federal government and the premiers of the states instituted the so-called  (Anti-Radical Decree). Under this decree, people who were considered to be a member or aligned to an extremist organization, were banned from work as civil servants, which includes a variety of public sector occupations such as teaching. The decree was declared as response to terrorism by the Red Army Faction.

 is the common name for the decree by people who opposed it, because they claim it contradicts the freedom of occupational choice guaranteed by the Basic Law of Germany. Law experts do not use the term for these cases as the decree does not forbid by itself.

The law was applied unevenly after 1979, and many of the states of Germany repealed the relevant legislation. The Landtag of Niedersachsen published a condemnation of the Berufsverbot practice. Other states, like Bavaria, still apply the decree.

Treatment under Council of Europe law 
In at least one case (Vogt v. Germany, 1995), the European Court of Human Rights found Germany in breach of its responsibilities to a citizen (a dismissed teacher who was an active member of the German Communist Party) under Article 10 (right to freedom of expression) and Article 11 (right to freedom of assembly and association) of the European Convention on Human Rights. The government subsequently settled with her, providing compensation for her time without full earnings, topping up her pension rights for that period, as well as other modest damages and costs.

See also 
 Disbarment

References 

 Bulletin of the Government of the Federal Republic of Germany no. 15 of 3 February 1972, p. 142
 Vogt v. Germany, European Court of Human Rights, sitting as a Grand Chamber in Strasbourg, main judgement delivered 2 September 1995.  Case number 7/1994/454/535. Application number 17851/91.

External links 
 the 1972 Anti-Radical Decree
 a chronology of the events in the Michael Csaszkóczy case, 2001-2006 from an anti-Berufsverbote site

Civil services
German labour law
Red Army Faction
Political repression in Germany